After withdrawing their affiliate from the Venezuelan Summer League, the Major League Baseball's New York Mets have had two affiliates in the Dominican Summer League since the 2010 season. The DSL Mets 1 play in the Boca Chica South division while the DSL Mets 2 play in the Boca Chica North division.

Rosters

External links 

Baseball teams established in 1992
Dominican Summer League teams
New York Mets minor league affiliates
Baseball teams in the Dominican Republic
1992 establishments in the Dominican Republic